Antipathes dendrochristos, commonly known as Christmas tree coral, is a species of colonial coral in the order Antipatharia, the black corals, so named because their calcareous skeletons are black.

References

Animals described in 2005
Antipathidae